The nene (Branta sandvicensis), also known as the nēnē or the Hawaiian goose, is a species of bird endemic to the Hawaiian Islands. The nene is exclusively found in the wild on the islands of Oahu, Maui, Kauai, Molokai, and Hawaii. In 1957, it was designated as the official state bird of the state of Hawaii.

The Hawaiian name nēnē comes from its soft call. The specific name sandvicensis refers to the Sandwich Islands, a former name for the Hawaiian Islands.

Taxonomy
The holotype specimen of Anser sandvicensis Vigors (List Anim. Garden Zool. Soc., ed.3, June 1833, p.4.) is held in the vertebrate zoology collection at World Museum, National Museums Liverpool, with accession number NML-VZ T12706. The specimen was collected from the Sandwich Islands (Hawaiian Islands) and came to the Liverpool national collection via the Museum of the Zoological Society of London collection, Thomas Campbell Eyton’s collection, and Henry Baker Tristram’s collection.

It is thought that the nene evolved from the Canada goose (Branta canadensis), which most likely arrived on the Hawaiian islands about 500,000 years ago, shortly after the island of Hawaii was formed. This ancestor is the progenitor of the nene as well as the prehistoric giant Hawaii goose (Branta rhuax) and nēnē-nui (Branta hylobadistes). The nēnē-nui was larger than the nene, varied from flightless to flighted depending on the individual, and inhabited the island of Maui. Similar fossil geese found on Oahu and Kauai may be of the same species. It is believed that the herbivorous giant Hawaii goose occupied the same ecological niche as the goose-like ducks known as moa-nalo, which were not present on the Big Island. Based on mitochondrial DNA found in fossils, all Hawaiian geese, living and extinct, are closely related to the giant Canada goose (B. c. maxima) and dusky Canada goose (B. c. occidentalis).

Description
Although they spend most of their time on the ground, they are capable of flight, with some individuals flying daily between nesting and feeding areas. Adult males have a black head and hindneck, buff cheeks and heavily furrowed neck. The neck has black and white diagonal stripes. Aside from being smaller, the female Nene is similar to the male in colouration. The adult's bill, legs and feet are black. It has soft feathers under its chin. Goslings resemble adults, but are a duller brown and with less demarcation between the colors of the head and neck, and striping and barring effects are much reduced.

Habitat and range
Some populations migrated between lowland breeding grounds and montane foraging areas.

The nene could at one time be found on the islands of Hawaii, Maui, Kahoolawe, Lānai, Molokai, Oʻahu and Kauai. Today, its range is restricted to Hawaii, Maui, Molokai, and Kauai. A pair arrived at the James Campbell National Wildlife Refuge on Oʻahu in January 2014; two of their offspring survived and are seen regularly on the nearby golf courses at Turtle Bay Resort.

Ecology and behavior

Breeding

The breeding season of the nene, from August to April, is longer than that of any other goose; most eggs are laid between November and January. Unlike most other waterfowl, the nene mates on land. Nests are built by females on a site of her choosing, in which one to five eggs are laid (average is three on Maui and Hawaii, four on Kauai). Females incubate the eggs for 29 to 32 days, while the male acts as a sentry. Goslings are precocial, able to feed on their own; they remain with their parents until the following breeding season.

Diet
The nene is a herbivore that will either graze or browse, depending on the availability of vegetation. Food items include the leaves, seeds, fruit, and flowers of grasses and shrubs.

Conservation
The nene population stands at 2,500 birds, making it the world's rarest goose. It is believed that it was once common, with approximately 25,000 Hawaiian geese living in Hawaii when Captain James Cook arrived in 1778. Hunting and introduced predators, such as small Indian mongooses, pigs, and feral cats, reduced the population to 30 birds by 1952. The species breeds well in captivity, and has been successfully re-introduced. In 2004, it was estimated that there were 800 birds in the wild, as well as 1,000 in wildfowl collections and zoos. There is concern about inbreeding due to the small initial population of birds. The nature reserve WWT Slimbridge, in England, was instrumental in the successful breeding of Hawaiian geese in captivity. Under the direction of conservationist Peter Scott, it was bred back from the brink of extinction during the 1950s for later re-introduction into the wild in Hawaii. There are still Hawaiian geese at Slimbridge today. They can now be found in captivity in multiple WWT centres. Successful introductions include Haleakala and Piiholo ranches on Maui.

References

External links

Aviculture
Birds described in 1833
Endemic birds of Hawaii
Branta
Geese
ESA endangered species
Hawaiian words and phrases
Taxa named by Nicholas Aylward Vigors